Roumégoux (Languedocien: Romegós, meaning (land of the) brambles) is a former commune in the Tarn department in southern France. On 1 January 2019, it was merged into the new commune Terre-de-Bancalié.

See also
Communes of the Tarn department

References

Former communes of Tarn (department)
Populated places disestablished in 2019